The Roman Catholic Diocese of  Ilorin is a diocese located in the city of Ilorin in the Ecclesiastical province of Ibadan in Nigeria.

History
 January 20, 1960: Established as Apostolic Prefecture of Ilorin from the Roman Catholic Diocese of Ondo.
 May 29, 1969: Promoted as Diocese of Ilorin

Special churches
The Cathedral is Saint Joseph Cathedral in Ilorin, Kwara State.

Bishops
 Prefects Apostolic of Ilorin (Roman rite) 
 Fr. William Mahony, S.M.A. (1960.12.06 – 1969.05.29 see below)
 Bishops of Ilorin (Roman rite)
 William Mahony, S.M.A. (see above 1969.05.29 – 1984.10.20)
 John Olorunfemi Onaiyekan (1984.10.20 – 1990.07.07), appointed Coadjutor Bishop of Abuja; future Cardinal
 Ayo-Maria Atoyebi, O.P. (1992.03.06 – 2019.06.11)
Paul Adegboyega Olawoore (2019.06.11 – 2022.01.01)

Coadjutor Bishop
Paul Adegboyega Olawoore (2018-2019)

Auxiliary Bishop
John Olorunfemi Onaiyekan (1982-1984), appointed Bishop here; future Cardinal

Other priests of this diocese who became bishops
Martin Igwe Uzoukwu, appointed Bishop of Minna in 1996 
Bulus Dauwa Yohanna (priest here, 1998-2002), appointed Vicar Apostolic of Kontagora in 2012

See also
Roman Catholicism in Nigeria

Sources
 GCatholic.org Information
 Catholic Hierarchy
 Official website

Roman Catholic dioceses in Nigeria
Christian organizations established in 1960
Roman Catholic dioceses and prelatures established in the 20th century
1960 establishments in Nigeria
Ilorin
Roman Catholic Ecclesiastical Province of Ibadan